Lee McCoy (born February 5, 1994) is an American professional golfer. He played his college golf at the University of Georgia and currently plays professionally on the Korn Ferry Tour. He previously played on the Mackenzie Tour-PGA Tour Canada.

Amateur career
McCoy was born in Dunedin, Florida, to Terry and Cheryl McCoy. He started playing golf when he was about 18 months old and grew up in a subdivision of Innisbrook Resort and Golf Club. For his final year of high school, McCoy moved to Georgia, where he won the 2012 Class 4A state championship and was named Georgia's player of the year. McCoy played college golf at the University of Georgia; as a junior he was named a first-team All-American and was a member of the U.S. 2015 Walker Cup and Palmer Cup teams. He qualified for the 2015 U.S. Open, missing the cut. At the 2016 Valspar Championship on the PGA Tour, McCoy tied the lowest round of the tournament with a 5-under 66 in the third round, eventually finishing the tournament in fourth place. He was the individual medalist at the 2016 Southeastern Conference men's golf championship, helping Georgia win the team portion of the championship. In the 2016 NCAA Division I Men's Golf Championship, McCoy finished in a tie for sixth place out of the 84 players who completed four rounds.

Professional career
McCoy turned professional after the national championship. In addition to his fourth-place finish at the Valspar, he played six additional PGA Tour events on sponsor's exemptions, missing the cut in all six. He received another sponsor's exemption to play in the 2016 Shriners Hospitals for Children Open, where he made the cut for the first time in his professional career, finishing T41. The day before the second stage of Web.com Tour qualifying school in November 2016, McCoy was in a car accident that shattered his wrist in two places. Doctors told him he was fortunate that he would be able to play golf again after the injury, as a bone in his hand could have fractured, potentially tearing all the ligaments in his hand.

In March 2017, McCoy attempted to earn status on the PGA Tour Canada. By finishing T14 in qualifying school, he earned status for at least the first four events of the season. He quickly erased any doubts about keeping his card by winning the first event of the season, the Freedom 55 Financial Open, in June. McCoy didn't do well enough to earn a Web.com Tour card, but he was medalist at the 2017 Q School, making him fully exempt on the Web.com Tour for 2018.

In June 2022, McCoy announced his retirement from golf via his twitter account, citing ongoing wrist injuries hindering him from playing professionally.

Professional wins (1)

PGA Tour Canada wins (1)

Results in major championships

CUT = missed the half-way cut
Note: McCoy only played in the U.S. Open.

Team appearances
Amateur
Palmer Cup (representing the United States):  2015 (winners)
Walker Cup (representing the United States):  2015

Professional
Aruba Cup (representing PGA Tour Canada): 2017 (winners)

References

External links

Profile on the University of Georgia's official athletic site

American male golfers
Georgia Bulldogs men's golfers
Pan American Games medalists in golf
Pan American Games silver medalists for the United States
Golfers at the 2015 Pan American Games
Medalists at the 2015 Pan American Games
Golfers from Florida
Golfers from Georgia (U.S. state)
People from Palm Harbor, Florida
People from Clarkesville, Georgia
1994 births
Living people